Moe, MOE, MoE or m.o.e. may refer to:

In arts and entertainment

Animals
 Moe (chimpanzee) (1967) pet chimpanzee who lived with  NASCAR driver St. James and his wife LaDonna Davis lived in West Covina, California

Characters
 Moe Szyslak, from the animated television show The Simpsons
 Moe, leader of The Three Stooges, played by Moe Howard
 Moe Higurashi, supporting character in Yashahime: Princess Half-Demon
 Moe, a bully from Calvin and Hobbes

Other
 , a Japanese slang term applied to characters in video games or anime and manga
 Moe (band), often stylized as "moe.", an American jam band formed in 1989
 Moe anthropomorphism, a type of anthropomorphism in Japanese artwork
 m.o.e., short for Master of Entertainment, a Pony Canyon label for some of their anime works
 Moe!, a 1990 album by Raptori

People
 Moe (given name), including nicknames
 Moe (surname)

Places

United States
 Moe Lake, a lake in Minnesota
 Moe Pond, a lake in New York
 Moe Township, Douglas County, Minnesota
 Moe Settlement, Wisconsin, a ghost town
 Mobile (Amtrak station), Amtrak station code MOE, Alabama

Elsewhere
 Moe, Estonia, a village
 Moe, Victoria, Australia
 Moe River (Australia), Victoria, Australia
 Moe River (rivière aux Saumons), Estrie, Quebec, Canada
 Moe Island, South Orkney Islands, Antarctica

Science and technology
 .moe, an internet top-level domain
 Mixture of experts (MoE), a machine learning technique
 Molecular Operating Environment, a software system sold by Chemical Computing Group
 Margin of error, the amount of random sampling error in the results of a survey

Other uses
 Battleships Asbjørnsen and Moe, rumored, but non-existent Norwegian ships that concerned Swedish intelligence services in 1905
 Magpul Original Equipment, a designation used by the manufacturer of firearms equipment
 Ministry of Education
 Margin of exposure

See also
 Mo (disambiguation)
 Moe's (disambiguation)
 Noe (disambiguation)